The Community Broadcasting Foundation (CBF) is an independent non-profit funding organisation based in Melbourne. The CBF receives funds from the Australian Government to distribute through grant programs to support the maintenance and development of community broadcasting in Australia.

The mission of the CBF is to assist the Australian community broadcasting sector in becoming well-resourced, independent, diverse and accessible.

The CBF aims to reflect the non-profit volunteer driven philosophy of the community broadcasting sector. As such it operates with a small secretariat and around forty volunteers who sit on various committees advising on grants and projects as well as the board of directors.

Funding

The CBF receives the bulk of its funds from the Australian Government through the Department of Communications.

The Foundation distributes funding through its Grants Advisory Committees.  CBF funding is designed to supplement the operational and development costs of the community broadcasting sector.  Grants are made for:
 national program production
 online developments including program distribution and exchange
 station infrastructure and operational support
 training
 national infrastructure development projects
 promotion of contemporary Australian music and musicians
 sector coordination and research.

Funding is also provided specifically for Ethnic, Indigenous, and RPH program production.
Their home page contains also interesting information very helpful in writing a grant proposals in general.

See also

Community Broadcasting Association of Australia
National Ethnic and Multicultural Broadcasters Council
Radio Print Handicapped Network
Australian Indigenous Communications Association

References

External links
 CBF 

Community radio organizations

Organisations based in Melbourne